Monica Elfriede Witt (born ) is a former United States Air Force technical sergeant and defense contractor who defected to Iran in 2013.  She is a fugitive from a United States Department of Justice indictment for espionage against the United States since 2018.

Born in Texas, Witt enlisted in the US Air Force in 1997 as a linguist and studied the Persian language at the Defense Language Institute before becoming an Airborne Cryptologic Language Analyst.  She was then assigned to the Department of the Air Force Office of Special Investigations (OSI) as an enlisted counterintelligence special agent until separating from the Air Force in 2008.  She continued working in intelligence as a military contractor until 2010.

After her 2012 conversion to Islam in Iran, Witt became increasingly focused on the religion and the region.  Her master's degree capstone presentation lauded them both, and she was soon affiliated with Marzieh Hashemi, a suspected Iranian intelligence operative.  With Hashemi's assistance, Witt defected to Iran in 2013 and provided the Islamic republic with assistance and intelligence stemming from her work for and with the US government.

Personal life
The New York Times reported that Witt's mother died shortly before Witt entered active duty in 1997, and that she had "drifted from her relatives" by 2008. By 2019, Witt's father—Harry Witt—lived in Longwood, Florida.

The New York Times reported that in 2011, "[Witt's] finances were a mess."  She moved into poor-quality subsidized housing in Falls Church, Virginia, and was homeless at one time.

In a 2013 interview with the International Quran News Agency, Witt described herself as a non-practicing Christian as of her US military enlistment.  She said that it was a mission to Iraq and a desire to understand Iraqis that prompted her to study the Quran.  Witt described her enthusiasm for the Islamic holy book, saying it "impressed me so much that I would have never imagined. I became so interested in the Quran that I studied it every night."  Witt described her friends, family, and the US military as influenced by "extensive" anti-Iranian and anti-Islamic propaganda in the US, and unaccepting of her religious turn.  The United States Department of Justice (DOJ) alleged that Witt appeared on television in Iran and converted to Islam there.

The DOJ indictment listed "Fatemah Zahra" and "Narges Witt" as aliases by which Witt has also been known, whereas US government sources say she was known there by the nickname "Wayward Storm".

Education
According to her curriculum vitae, Witt has a bachelor's degree from University of Maryland, College Park, a master's degree from George Washington University (GWU), and Persian-language certification from the Defense Language Institute.

When Witt returned from Iran to her studies at GWU, she had "transformed."  Now wearing hijabs and speaking highly of Iran and her conversion to Islam, she was described by her classmates as "extreme."  Another student in Witt's graduate program said that Witt's capstone presentation was a "love letter to Iran" that downplayed that nation's nuclear program; when Witt received strong push-back from her committee members, "she was almost offended that the assumption that Iran was a peace-loving nation would even be questioned […] She was visibly upset."

Career
As both a servicemember and civilian contractor, Witt worked with military intelligence and had access to "ongoing counterintelligence operations and the true names of intelligence assets and the identities of American officials involved in their recruitment."

US Air Force
Witt joined the United States Air Force in August or December 1997. From approximately February 1998April 1999, Witt was assigned to the Defense Language Institute to be trained in the Persian language. Between May 1999November 2003, Witt deployed several times to conduct classified missions and collect signals intelligence on US enemies.

During the early days of the Iraq War, Staff Sergeant Witt was an Airborne Cryptologic Language Analyst deployed to the 95th Reconnaissance Squadron, stationed at Crete Naval Base.  When war broke out on 20 March 2003, the following three weeks saw sustained, major combat operations, and Witt was an aircrew member of a Boeing RC-135V/W Rivet Joint.  For this duty, Witt was awarded the Air Medal by US President George W. Bush:

Witt was transferred to Andrews Air Force Base from Offutt Air Force Base in November 2003, and began her assignment as an Air Force Office of Special Investigations (OSI) special agent, focusing on criminal investigation and counterintelligence.  Witt continued deploying, conducting classified operations in the Middle East, and had access to a special access program (SAP)  classified information, including details of ongoing counterintelligence operations, true names of sources, and the identities of U.S. agents involved in the recruitment of those sources."  Witt retained access to the SAP, acting as its OSI Desk Officer even after her enlistment, until August 2010.

Throughout her service with the US military, Witt deployed to Saudi Arabia, Diego Garcia, Greece, Iraq, and Qatar.  In addition to her Air Medal, Witt received three Air Force Commendation Medals and three Aerial Achievement Medals.  Witt separated as a technical sergeant in either June or March 2008.  Speaking to the International Quran News Agency in 2013, Witt claimed that her desire to convert to Islam and pushback therefor were driving factors in her decision to leave the Air Force.

Civilian
For the rest of 2008, Witt worked in Maryland for Booz Allen Hamilton as a defense contractor, "consulting on 'Iranian subject matter' and providing 'language and cultural specialisation'."  Witt next worked for a contractor, Chenega Federal Systems, as a "Middle East Desk Officer [who] supervised, controlled, and co-ordinated the execution of highly sensitive counterintelligence operations against foreign intelligence services worldwide".  Upon leaving the employ of United States Intelligence Community entities in August 2010, Witt lost her TOP SECRET/SCI security clearance.

Until May 2011, she worked for the nonprofit organization AMIDEAST, submitting "applications for 60 Iraqi Fulbright Program candidates to multiple US universities".  In 2012, she published two articles in GWU's International Affairs Review.  Press TV also published an article by Witt in which she accused the United States Armed Forces of having "a prevailing culture of tolerance for sexual harassment".

Defection
At George Washington University (GWU), Witt's classmates described her as withdrawn and quiet, though when she spoke about her military service, she described "drone strikes, extrajudicial killings and atrocities against children, all of which […] her colleagues in the military would brag about.  She seemed distressed by what she called 'gross incompetence' by her superiors during her time abroad."  All of this allegedly gave Witt insomnia.  About herself, Witt described an isolated woman conflicted about her self-concept and sense of belonging.

Witt traveled to Iran in February 2012 to attend an International Conference on Hollywoodism that condemned the morality of the United States, promoted anti-Americanism, included an anti-Western sentiment, and "propagate[d] anti-Semitism and conspiracy theories including Holocaust denial".  The conference was orchestrated by the "New Horizon Organization", and its sponsor was the Islamic Revolutionary Guard Corps (IRGC).  Former United States Senator Mike Gravel, another attendee of a Hollywoodism conference said of the IRGC there, "They were very sophisticated, and they've got young people, well-appearing people speaking English beautifully, […] They're equipped to do the job of intelligence work, and if they find vulnerable people, they just capitalize on it."  Nader Talebzadeh, an organizer of the conference, would later say that Witt seemed ungenuine in her exuberance about Iran and Islam.

While in Iran, Witt was voluntarily video-recorded identifying as a US military veteran and making statements critical of the federal government of the United States.  These statements and her conversion to Islam were broadcast on Iranian television that same month.  Contemporaneous with her graduation from GWU, the Federal Bureau of Investigation (FBI) warned Witt that she was a target of Iranian intelligence recruiting; Witt assured US authorities she would not give sensitive information to Iran.  Within a month, Witt was hired by American-Iranian journalist and television presenter Marzieh Hashemi "in connection with the filming of an anti-American propaganda film that was later aired in Iran."

From June 2012 through August 2013, Witt was regularly communicating with an Iranian American; this individual held dual citizenship and acted in ways consistent with being an Iranian intelligence operative.  The New York Times identified this person as Marzieh Hashemi.  In her communications with Hashemi, Witt suggested she might leak intelligence data to the media ("If all else fails, I just may go public with a program and do like Snowden"), or defect to Russia instead ("I just hope I have better luck with Russia at this point. […] I think I can slip into Russia quietly if they help me and then I can contact wikileaks from there without disclosing my location.")

Witt attended another Hollywoodism conference at the Parsian Azadi Hotel in February 2013.  While in Tehran, Witt spoke with Kevin Barrett saying "she had been involved in horrific war crimes with the Air Force, […] And she just felt really bad about it."  Witt also participated in more, similar anti-American videos as before.  Beginning in July 2013, Witt repeatedly searched Facebook for former counterintelligence coworkers, including an intelligence operative who worked with Witt's previous special access program, and the spouse of another.  On 25 August 2013, Witt emailed Hashemi with evidence of her good faith, genuineness, qualifications, and/or achievements, as well as a "conversion narrative", a chronological work history, and Witt's DD Form 214.  Nine minutes later, Hashemi forwarded the email to "an email address associated with Iran."  On 28 August 2013, Witt boarded a flight from Dubai to Tehran ("I'm signing off and heading out! Coming home ☺.") and officially defected to Iran.

Witt's US friends last heard from her in the summer of 2013 when she was in Afghanistan or Tajikistan teaching English as a second or foreign language; they reported her missing after several months of non-communication.  Before the unsealing of the indictment against her, Witt was the subject of an FBI missing person case.  As part of their appeal to the public, the FBI announced that Witt had previously traveled to the United Arab Emirates and Iran.

On 9 July 2018, a grand jury was convened in the United States District Court for the District of Columbia to evaluate eight counts of Title 18 charges brought against Witt and four others.  This sealed indictment was released on 13 February 2019, detailing the charges of espionage, fraud, and aiding and abetting.  , Witt remained fugitive from a US warrant for her arrest, and the US government believed she still resided in Iran.  In April 2019, Hashemi denied having a hand in recruiting Witt.

Iranian espionage
Immediately upon her arrival in Iran, Witt was furnished with "housing and computer equipment, in order to facilitate her work on behalf of the Government of Iran."  She promptly told officials the code name and mission of the United States Department of Defense special access program to which she previously had access: classified US intelligence operations against a specific target.  From January 2014 through May 2015, Witt used fraudulent Facebook accounts to investigate intelligence personnel and prepare "target packages" for Iran to use and attempt recruitment.  Witt also gave Iran the classified true name and counterintelligence activities of a US Intelligence Community operative.  These disclosures were categorized by the FBI's executive assistant director for national security as having the potential to "cause serious damage to [United States] national security".  Witt is also alleged to have been involved in the questioning of ten United States Navy sailors captured in the 2016 U.S.–Iran naval incident.

In 2019, it was believed that Witt was working with the cyberwarfare group Phosphorus (also called Charming Kitten among other names).  In October 2019, Microsoft announced that Phosphorus had spent that August and September attempting to compromise accounts associated with a candidate in the 2020 United States presidential election (TechCrunch noted that only Donald Trump and Mark Sanford were known to use Microsoft's email services).  By 2021, some Central Intelligence Agency officials believed Witt had exposed their informants and disrupted their intelligence-gathering in Iran.

See also
 
 List of fugitives from justice who disappeared

References

1979 births
20th-century American military personnel
21st-century American military personnel
21st-century American women
21st-century Muslims
21st-century spies
American defectors
American emigrants to Iran
American Muslims
Booz Allen Hamilton people
converts to Islam from Christianity
Defense Language Institute alumni
female United States Air Force personnel
female wartime spies
fugitives wanted by the United States
George Washington University alumni
Iranian spies
living people
people from El Paso, Texas
recipients of the Air Medal
United States Air Force Office of Special Investigations
University of Maryland, College Park alumni